Mark Edmondson and Kim Warwick won in the final 6–4, 6–4 against Nelson Aerts and Tomm Warneke.

Seeds

  Mark Edmondson /  Kim Warwick (champion)
  Peter Doohan /  Brad Drewett (quarterfinal)
  Broderick Dyke /  Wally Masur (first round)
  C Dowdeswell /  A Mansdorf (quarterfinal)

Draw

Draw

References
1985 South Australian Open Doubles Draw
1985 South Australian Open Doubles Draw

Doubles